Braňany is a municipality and village in Most District at the Ústí nad Labem Region of the Czech Republic. It has about 1,200 inhabitants.

Administrative parts
The hamlet of Kaňkov is an administrative part of Braňany.

References

Villages in Most District